Franz Josef Wagner (born 7 August 1943 in Olomouc) is a German author and journalist. He was editor-in-chief of Bild, launched Elle Germany and has written a number of books, at least one of which was adapted for the screen.

Life 
His father was a teacher and his mother a teacher for household. In his childood, Wagner lived in Regensburg. After school he began to work for the newspaper Nürnberger Zeitung. In 1960s he got a job as journalist at German newspaper BILD in Munich. From 1966 he worked as journalist for media company Axel Springer in Hamburg. There he worked as war correspondent and later editor-in-chief. In 1988, Wagner began to work as journalist for Hubert Burda Media in Munich. There he was editor-in-chief for the magazine Bunte. Together with journalist Günter Prinz he started magazines Elle and Superillu and then in 1991 magazine Super1. In July 1998 Wagner went back to company Axel Springer and became editor-in-chief as journalist for newspaper BILD. He lost his work as editor-in-chief in 2000.  Since 2001 Wagner writes a columne Post von Wagner in newspaper BILD.  As author Wagner wrote several books.

He is married, has one daughter and lives in Berlin-Charlottenburg.

Books by Wagner

Novels 
 Das Ding, Blanvalet. Munich 1978. ISBN 3-7645-0854-X (1979 as film in German television station ZDF)
 Im September, wenn ich noch lebe. Blanvalet. München 1979. ISBN 3-7645-5302-2
 Big Story, Bertelsmann. Munich 1982. ISBN 3-570-01857-1
 Wolfs Spur, Bertelsmann. Munich 1984. ISBN 3-570-00279-9

As ghostwriter 
 Udo Jürgens: Smoking und Blue Jeans – Jahre eines Traumtänzers. Lübbe. Bergisch Gladbach 1984. ISBN 3-7857-0378-3
 Franz Beckenbauer: Ich – Wie es wirklich war. C. Bertelsmann. Munich 1992. ISBN 3-570-02079-7
 Boris Becker: Augenblick, verweile doch … Bertelsmann. Munich 2003. ISBN 3-570-00780-4

Autobiography 
 Brief an Deutschland, Diederichs, Munich 2010, ISBN 978-3-424-35041-8

References

External links 
 
 Post von Wagner – Alle Kolumnen von Wagner seit 2007 auf bild.de

German male journalists
20th-century German journalists
21st-century German journalists
German male writers
Bild people
1943 births
Writers from Berlin
Living people